Abraham "Sonny" Karnofsky (September 22, 1922 – January 9, 2015) was an American football halfback who played for the Philadelphia Eagles and Boston Yanks. He played college football at the University of Arizona, having previously attended Phoenix Union High School. He died at his home in Galt, California on January 9 2015 after a long battle with lung cancer.

References

1922 births
2015 deaths
American football halfbacks
Arizona Wildcats football players
Philadelphia Eagles players
Boston Yanks players
Sportspeople from Oxnard, California
Players of American football from California
Deaths from lung cancer
People from Galt, California
Sportspeople from Ventura County, California